Darius Allen (born April 8, 1992) is an American professional gridiron football defensive end who is a free agent.

College career
Allen played college football for the CSU–Pueblo ThunderWolves from 2011 to 2014. He won the Gene Upshaw Award as the best lineman in Division II in 2013 and 2014.

Professional career
Allen signed with the Baltimore Ravens in May 2015. He was cut by the Ravens on May 12, 2015.

He signed with the BC Lions in February 2016. During the 2016 CFL season, Allen recorded four defensive tackles and a sack.

He signed with the Edmonton Eskimos in August 2017.

Allen signed a contract extension with the BC Lions on January 14, 2021. He was released on June 10, 2021.

References

External links
 Edmonton Eskimos bio

1992 births
Living people
American football defensive linemen
Players of Canadian football from Colorado
BC Lions players
Canadian football defensive linemen
CSU Pueblo ThunderWolves football players
Edmonton Elks players
Players of American football from Colorado
Sportspeople from Pueblo, Colorado